Busy Monsters is the debut novel of William Giraldi, released in 2011. It centers on Charles Homar, a writer whose fiancée runs away with her colleague to catch an elusive giant squid, seemingly cutting ties with him. Charles attempts to regain her affection and finds himself budding  into a strange cast of characters on the way.

References

External links
The A.V. Club Review
The Washington Post Review

2011 American novels
2011 science fiction novels
2011 debut novels
W. W. Norton & Company books